Atwater Apartments is an apartment skyscraper adjacent to the Streeterville neighborhood in Chicago, Illinois, in the United States. It was previously called Streeter Place.

The building was completed in 2009. It contains 54 stories, 480 units, and many amenities.

See also
List of tallest buildings in Chicago

References

Residential skyscrapers in Chicago
Streeterville, Chicago
2009 establishments in Illinois
Residential buildings completed in 2009